José Pedro Croft (born 1957 in Porto) is a visual artist. Considered as one of the main representatives of the revival of Portuguese sculpture, he is widely known for his geometric sculptures and paintings.

José Pedro Croft was born in Porto in 1957. He studied painting at the Escola Superior de Belas Artes in Lisbon, where he has lived since his teenage years.

Collections 
Today, his work is present in the collections of various international museums and institutions such as the Centre Pompidou in Paris, the Museo Nacional Centro de Arte Reina Sofía in Madrid, the Fondation Calouste Gulbenkian in Lisbon or the Museu de Arte Moderna in Rio de Janeiro

Monographs 

 Ed. João Pinharanda, José Pedro Croft/ Medida Incerta, 2017 (Hatje Cantz Editions), 
 Ed. Instituto Açoriano de Cultura, José Pedro Croft. gravura, 2009 (Tristan Barbara Editions).
 Ed. Isabel C Rodrigues, José Pedro Croft Esculture. Desenho. Gravura. Fotografia, 2011 (Bial Editions), 
 José Pedro Croft Objectos Imediatos, 2014 (Documenta Editions), 
 Helena de Gubernatis, José Pedro Croft 1979-2002, 2002 (Fundação Centro Cultural de Belém Editions), 
 Ed. Delfim Sardo, Una coisa José Pedro Croft, 2019 (Galeria municipal dde Matosinhos Editions),

References 

1957 births
Living people
Artists from Porto
Portuguese artists